The Confederation Building serves as the home of the Newfoundland and Labrador House of Assembly. It is located on Confederation Hill overlooking Newfoundland and Labrador's capital city, St. John's. It was completed in 1960 at a cost of $9 million to replace the Colonial Building. A lantern is located at the top of the copper roof of the central tower and acts as a beacon when turned on at night.

The original building is now considered the East Block of the Confederation Building. A third building on the legislature campus is the Service Building Annex a two-storey building housing a day care centre and garage for some provincial government vehicles.

Complex
The complex consists of two buildings that house most departments of the Government of Newfoundland and Labrador. It also contains the provincial legislature, and offices for elected members.

East Block
The original and tallest of the two buildings.

It is home to these provincial government departments, agencies, and offices:
Office of the Premier
Executive Council of Newfoundland and Labrador
Department of Finance
Department of Justice and Public Safety
House of Assembly
Office of the Official Opposition
Office of the Third Party
Government Members Office
Protocol Office
Cabinet Secretariat
Communications and Consultation Branch
Hansard Office
House of Assembly Broadcast Centre

West Block
Opened in 1985, this building is to the west of the East Block and contains most other provincial government departments, and various offices and agencies:
Department of Immigration, Skills and Labour
Department of Education
Department of Health and Community Services
Department of Tourism, Culture, Arts and Recreation
Department of Environment and Climate Change
Department of Children, Seniors and Social Development
Department of Transportation and Infrastructure
Department of Municipal and Provincial Affairs 
Digital Government and Service NL
Office of Public Engagement
Center for Learning and Development
Policy Innovation and Accountability Office
Office of Women and Gender Equality
Disability Policy Office

Off site
Remaining departments of the provincial government are located in other offices in St. John's:

81 Kenmount Road - Department of Children, Seniors and Social Development
Petten Building, Strawberry Marsh Road - Department of Fisheries, Forestry and Agriculture 
Industry, Energy and Technology Building, 50 Elizabeth Avenue - Department of Industry, Energy and Technology
Howley Building, Higgins Line - Department of Industry, Energy and Technology, Department of Environment, Climate Change, and Municipalities
40 Higgins Line - Office of the Chief Information Officer
Sir Brian Dunfield Building, 50 Mundy Pond Road - Public Service Commission
Argyle Building, Portugal Cove Rd - Research and Development Corporation
25 Hallett Crescent - Fire and Emergency Services
2 Canada Drive - Office of the Information and Privacy Commissioner

Statues and landmarks at the Legislature

A number of statues and landmarks are located near the building:

Statue of Gaspar Corte-Real - located southeast of the building
Statue of John Cabot - located at the foot of the steps at the East Block
Statue of Sir Wilfred Grenfell
An enamel-coated metal coat of arms of Newfoundland and Labrador donated by businessman Paul J. Hohnson in 2000 is surrounded by a Gothic Revival stone lookout located in front of the East Block
the flag of Canada, flag of Newfoundland and Labrador, and the British Union Jack fly in front of the building

See also

Executive Council of Newfoundland and Labrador
Memorial University of Newfoundland

References

Buildings and structures in St. John's, Newfoundland and Labrador
Legislative buildings in Canada
Government buildings completed in 1960
General Assembly of Newfoundland and Labrador